The Church of All Saints in Kingston Seymour, Somerset, England dates from the late 14th or early 15th century. It has been designated as a Grade I listed building.

History
The base of the font is older than the church itself being Norman in origin.

The church is almost surrounded by water and was inundated with water to a depth of  during the Bristol Channel floods of 1607. A brass plaque in the church reads:
An inundation of the sea water by overflowing and breaking down the Sea banks; happened in this Parish of Kingstone-Seamore, and many others adjoining; by reason whereof many Persons were drown'd and much Cattle and Goods, were lost: the water in the Church was five feet high and the greatest part lay on the ground about ten days. WILLIAM BOWER
The tower contains a peal of six bells, including three from 1632 which were cast by Purdues of Bristol. The shaft was added in 1863.

The stained glass includes the Smyth-Piggot memorial in the west window which was replaced in a restoration of 1917 to designs by Roland Paul.

Administration
The parish is part of the Yatton Moor benefice within the deanery of Portishead.

See also

 Grade I listed buildings in North Somerset
 List of Somerset towers

References

External links
Official Church website

15th-century church buildings in England
Church of England church buildings in North Somerset
Grade I listed churches in Somerset
Grade I listed buildings in North Somerset